Jenifer Lynn Alcorn (born July 15, 1970) is a retired, undefeated WIBA, IWBF, and IBA World Champion female professional boxer.

Alcorn grew up in Le Grand, California and later moved to Fresno. She was well known in Fresno athletic circles before beginning her career as a boxer. She was a stand-out high school athlete and attended California State University, Fresno.

Despite only having six amateur bouts, Alcorn fought in the women's nationals, 1999 USA Boxing National Championships, losing a 10-1 decision to eventual silver medalist Jean Martin of Brooklyn, N.Y. in the 139 pound quarterfinals.

Alcorn then launched a professional boxing career, with one goal above all others.....to set an example of achievement and success through hard work for her children.

She made her pro debut on July 2, 1999 in Fresno, where she TKO'd Robyn Covino in 0:59 seconds of the first round.

Alcorn eventually stepped up her level of competition by taking on undefeated Jessica Rakoczy, for the vacant IWBF Lightweight title. Alcorn won a ten-round split (96-94 92-98 98-92) decision over Rakoczy, by carrying the fight to Rakoczy aggressively.

On April 19, 2003 at Selland Arena in Fresno, Alcorn won an eight-round unanimous (78-74 77-75 77-75) decision over Mia St. John.

On December 11, 2003 at Palace Indian Gaming Center in Lemoore, California, Alcorn won a ten-round split (96-93 96-93 94-95) decision over Melissa Del Valle for the vacant WIBA Lightweight title. Alcorn was knocked down by a left hook in the second round, and Del Valle landed effectively with overhand rights throughout the bout. However, Del Valle faded in the late going and Alcorn won the critical late rounds. Alcorn remained undefeated at 18-0-0 (11 KO) while Del Valle fell to 28-4-1 (11 KO).

Soon after the Del Valle fight, Alcorn announced her retirement from boxing on February 5, 2004, citing the stress that her boxing career placed on her children. saying "After eight years of training, I know I'll feel the effects of walking away, but I've seen fighters stay in too long, and I've seen the effect it has on their mind and body. By going out on top, the worst I'll be is a former 3-time World Champion. Every good thing has to come to an end." She says she will continue her work with the Fresno State women's basketball team and her fitness training business.

Alcorn and her family appeared on the October 9, 2006 episode of the U.S. version of Wife Swap.

Alcorn also runs a successful 'bootcamp' style workout routine called Team JIB JAB for those who want to better themselves through diet and exercise.

Professional boxing record

References

External links

 BoxingRecords

1970 births
Living people
American women boxers
California State University, Fresno alumni
Sportspeople from Fresno, California
Boxers from California
World boxing champions
Lightweight boxers
21st-century American women